Ismayil Yusif oghlu Hajiyev, commonly known as Ismayil Daghistanli (6 January 1907 – 1 April 1980) was an Azerbaijani and Soviet stage and film actor and pedagogue. He was awarded People's Artist of the Azerbaijani SSR (1949), and People's Artist of the USSR (1974).

Biography 
Ismayil Daghistanli was born on 6 January 1907 in Zərnə village of Qakh District. He began his stage career in 1925 in the drama society under the Nukha Central Workers 'and Peasants' Club. He studied at Baku Theater College from 1926 to 1930. From 1927 he also performed on the stage of the Drama Theater as an practitioner actor. From 1930 he worked intermittently at Azerbaijan National Drama Theatre, in 1936–1937 at Yerevan Drama Theater, and was a director and actor of the Azerbaijani theater he organized in Derbent in 1932–1933.

Since 1938, he had created a series of classic characters on the stage of Azerbaijan National Drama Theatre. He became famous on the Azerbaijani stage as the first performer of the roles of V. I. Lenin. In the last years of his life he worked as the head of the department at Azerbaijan Institute of Arts. He had published several books about actors and theater.

Ismayil Hajiyev died on 1 April 1980 in Baku.

Awards

Filmography

References 

1907 births
1980 deaths
20th-century Azerbaijani male actors
Azerbaijan State University of Culture and Arts alumni
Baku State University alumni
Communist Party of the Soviet Union members
People's Artists of the USSR
Stalin Prize winners
Recipients of the Order of Friendship of Peoples
Recipients of the Order of Lenin
Recipients of the Order of the Red Banner of Labour
Azerbaijani male film actors
Azerbaijani male stage actors
Soviet male film actors
Soviet male stage actors
Burials at Alley of Honor